Major Daniel Webster Whittle (November 22, 1840, Chicopee Falls, Massachusetts -  March 4, 1901, Northfield, Massachusetts) was a 19th-century American gospel song lyricist, evangelist, and Bible teacher.

Life and career

Whittle was associated with the evangelistic campaigns of Dwight Lyman Moody.

Marrying Abbie Hanson in 1861 the night before he deployed with Company B of the 72d Illinois Infantry, he served in the American Civil War. He was wounded at Vicksburg and marched with General William Tecumseh Sherman’s forces through Georgia. Whittle was breveted with the rank of major at the end of the war and is still widely known among hymnologists as Major Whittle. Settling in Chicago to work for the Elgin Clock Company, he became closely associated with Moody, who successfully encouraged him to go into evangelistic work. 
 One of Whittle’s war experiences served as the basis for the gospel song "Hold the Fort" by Philip Paul Bliss, of whom Whittle edited a biography. He was also known to have worked with Bliss' sister, Mary Elizabeth Willson.

Whittle wrote mostly under the pseudonym "El Nathan" although editors of later hymnals routinely credit his actual name. Of his approximately 200 hymns, "I Know Whom I Have Believed" and "Showers of Blessing" are among the most familiar. James McGranahan wrote the tunes for both of those and for Whittle's "Banner of the Cross" as well. The name of the tune associated with "I Know Whom I Have Believed" is EL NATHAN, Whittle's pseudonym. The tune for Whittle's "Moment by Moment" (first line "Dying with Jesus") was composed by Whittle's daughter Mary "May" Whittle Moody.

Writings of Daniel W. Whittle
 Memoirs of Philip P. Bliss edited by D.W. Whittle. Chicago: A. S. Barnes and Company, 1877. B00085OH8S 
 Jonathan and other poems. BiblioBazaar, 2009 September. Old Tappan, New Jersey: Fleming H. Revell company, 1900.   
 The Wonders of Prayer. BiblioBazaar, 2009 February 10. .

Example of hymn: "I Know Whom I Have Believed"

References

External links

 Hymn music of D W Whittle
 
 

1840 births
1901 deaths
American Christian hymnwriters
American evangelists
American gospel musicians
United States Army officers
Writers from Illinois
Writers from Massachusetts
People from Chicopee, Massachusetts
19th-century American writers
Songwriters from Massachusetts
Union Army officers
Military personnel from Massachusetts